Frenchman's Creek is a 1944 adventure film adaptation of Daphne du Maurier's 1941 novel of the same name, about an aristocratic English woman who falls in love with a French pirate. The film was released by Paramount Pictures and starred Joan Fontaine, Arturo de Córdova, Basil Rathbone, Cecil Kellaway, and Nigel Bruce. Filmed in Technicolor, it was directed by Mitchell Leisen. The musical score was by Victor Young, who incorporated the main theme of French composer Claude Debussy's Clair de Lune as the love theme for the film.

The film is a mostly faithful adaptation of the novel, taking place during the reign of Charles II in the mid-17th century, mostly in the Cornish region of England.

Fontaine was under contract to independent producer to David O. Selznick, who loaned out his contract players to other studios. In this case, Fontaine was loaned to Paramount for this lavish production. She later complained about her work with director Leisen and some of her costars. The film's budget of $3.6 million made it Paramount's most expensive production up to that time.

Cast members Rathbone and Bruce were known for appearing together as Holmes and Dr. Watson, respectively, in the Sherlock Holmes films by Universal Studios. Frenchman's Creek was their only on-screen collaboration besides the Holmes films.

The film was released as an on demand DVD August 28, 2014 (Amazon); and has been shown on American Movie Classics and Turner Classic Movies.

Plot summary
Set in 17th century Cornwall and London, Joan Fontaine stars in the swashbuckling adventure Frenchman's Creek. As a beautiful, learned Lady of means, Dona St. Columb (Fontaine) had it all – wealth, nobility, children ... and a loveless marriage. After years of being royally subjected to mistreatment, she retreats with her most prized possessions – her two children – to a secluded manor overlooking Britain's Atlantic shoreline. Once there, she is enthralled with the tall tales of a scoundrel of a pirate, who has been plundering nearby coastal villages. Full of adventure and fueled by years of neglect, she sets forth to seek him out, and it is not long before she finds him ... to be quite an irresistible gentleman. She is soon swept into his arms, and out onto a seaborne adventure where she chances death to protect her children from a vengeful father, who is out to reclaim what he had never known and to destroy something he had never shown – love. Earning Academy Awards for both Art Direction and Set Design, movie lovers will delight in this lavish Technicolor example of golden age Hollywood escapism.

Cast
 Joan Fontaine as Dona St. Columb
 Arturo de Córdova as Jean Benoit Aubrey
 Basil Rathbone as Lord Rockingham
 Nigel Bruce as Lord Godolphin
 Cecil Kellaway as William
 Ralph Forbes as Harry St. Columb
 Harald Ramond as Edmond
 Billy Daniels as Pierre Blanc
 Moyna Macgill as Lady Godolphin
 Patricia Barker as Henrietta
 David James as James
 Charles Coleman as Thomas (uncredited)
 James Dime as Pirate (uncredited)
 Al Ferguson as Guard (uncredited)

Reception
Bosley Crowther of The New York Times called the film "somewhat slow in starting", but observed that the production values were suitably extravagant and invited readers to "catch a post-chaise to the Rivoli and check your think-cap at the door if you want a two-hour excursion in fancy-pants cloak-and-sword escape." Variety agreed that the production values were "ultra", but found that the script "at times borders on the ludicrous". Harrison's Reports called it "A good costume entertainment" with "a fair quota of thrills ... It does, however, have many slow spots, and some judicious cutting would help matters considerably." John Lardner of The New Yorker wrote: "Not having read the Daphne du Maurier novel called Frenchman's Creek, I am powerless to say how it compares with the picture of the same name. My guess, like any gallant fellow's, would be that it compares favorably."

Awards
The film won an Academy Award for Best Art Direction (Hans Dreier, Ernst Fegté, Samuel M. Comer).

See also
 The Wicked Lady, a British film made a year later and telling a similar story but with very different sensibilities.
 List of American films of 1944

References

External links
 
 
 
 
 Frenchman's Creek on Theater of Romance: May 22, 1954

1944 films
1940s historical adventure films
American historical adventure films
Paramount Pictures films
Pirate films
Films based on works by Daphne du Maurier
Films scored by Victor Young
Films whose art director won the Best Art Direction Academy Award
Films directed by Mitchell Leisen
Films based on British novels
Films set in Cornwall
Films set in the 1660s
1940s English-language films
1940s American films